Belize – Brazil relations are the bilateral relations between Belize and Brazil. Belize has an embassy in Brasilia, while Brazil has an embassy in Belmopan.

See also
 Foreign relations of Belize
 Foreign relations of Brazil

References

Brazil
Bilateral relations of Brazil